The company was formed by members of the Atari ST demoscene in October 1988, in Gütersloh, Germany. The main aim of Thalion Software was to produce cutting edge technology games. Despite the technical quality, sales of the games never really matched expectations and by the end of 1994 the developers had left and the company eventually closed. The two founders were Erik Simon (of The Exceptions) and Holger Flöttmann. Flöttmann later went on to found another video games company, Ascaron.

Game releases
Chambers of Shaolin (1989)
Warp (1989)
Seven Gates of Jambala (1989)
Leavin' Teramis (1990)
Atomix (1990)
Dragonflight (1990)
Wings of Death (precursor of Lethal Xcess) (1990)
Enchanted Land (1990)
Magic Lines (1990)
Tower FRA (1990)
A Prehistoric Tale (1991)
Ghost Battle (1991)
Tangram (1991)
Trex Warrior (1991)
A320 Airbus (1991)
Amberstar (1992)
No Second Prize (1992)
Neuronics (1992)
Lionheart (1993)
A320 Airbus Edition:Europa (1993)
A320 Airbus Edition:USA (1993)
Ambermoon (1993)

References
An in depth article on the story of Thalion appeared in issue 126 of Retro Gamer magazine

External links
 Thalion Webshrine
 Thalion Source 
 Thalion Software profile on MobyGames

Defunct video game companies of Germany
Video game companies established in 1988
Companies based in North Rhine-Westphalia